The Marshall Thundering Herd football team, representing Marshall University, has had 44 players drafted into the National Football League (NFL) since the league began holding drafts in 1936. This includes three players taken in the first round. The New England Patriots have drafted the most Marshall players with five. Four former Thundering Herd have been selected to a Pro Bowl, six former Thundering Herd have won a league championship with their respective teams, and one former Thundering have been selected to both a Pro Bowl and won a league championship.

Each NFL franchise seeks to add new players through the annual NFL Draft. The draft rules were last updated in 2009. The team with the worst record the previous year picks first, the next-worst team second, and so on. Teams that did not make the playoffs are ordered by their regular-season record with any remaining ties broken by strength of schedule. Playoff participants are sequenced after non-playoff teams, based on their round of elimination (wild card, division, conference, and Super Bowl).

Before the merger agreements in 1966, the American Football League (AFL) operated in direct competition with the NFL and held a separate draft. This led to a massive bidding war over top prospects between the two leagues. As part of the merger agreement on June 8, 1966, the two leagues would hold a multiple round "common draft". When the AFL officially merged with the NFL in 1970, the "Common Draft" simply became the NFL Draft.

Key

Selections

Notes

Notable undrafted players
Note: No drafts held before 1920

References
General

Specific

External links
 

Marshall

Marshall Thundering Herd NFL Draft